Donald R. Davis is an American economist. He is the Ragnar Nurkse Professor of Economics at Columbia University.

Biography 
Davis received his B.A. from the University of California, Berkeley and Ph.D. from Columbia University. He taught at Harvard University before joining Columbia's faculty in 1999, and was appointed chair of the economics department in 2001.

Davis' research focuses on testing international trade theories and his theoretical contributions include improving the Heckscher–Ohlin model by relaxing assumptions underlying factor price equalization to generate high predictive success using the model to forecast international trade. His research scholarship has focused on economic geography and the inequality within cities.

References 

Living people
Columbia University faculty
Harvard University faculty
Columbia Graduate School of Arts and Sciences alumni
University of California, Berkeley alumni
American economists
Year of birth missing (living people)